Hangl is a surname. Notable people with the surname include:

Marco Hangl (born 1967), Swiss alpine skier
Martin Hangl (born 1962), Swiss alpine skier